There are 152 colleges of education in Nigeria, consisting of 27 federal, 82 private and 54 state colleges of education.

Federal colleges

This is a list of approved federal colleges of education in Nigeria.

Private colleges
This is a list of approved private colleges of education in Nigeria.

State colleges
 Abia State College of Education (Technical)
 Adamawa State College of Education
 Adamu Augie College of Education
 Adamu Tafawa Balewa College of Education
 Adeniran Ogunsanya College of Education
 Akwa Ibom State College of Education
 Aminu Saleh College of Education
 Bilyaminu Othman College of Education
 College of Education and Legal Studies, Nguru
 College Of Education, Akamkpa
 College of Education, Akwanga
 College of Education, Billiri
 College of Education, Ekiadolor
 College of Education, Gindiri
 College of Education, Katsina-Ala
 College Of Education, Lanlate
 College of Education, Oju
 College of Education, Waka-Biu
 College of Education, Warri
 Ebonyi State College of Education
 Edo State College of Education
 Enugu State College of Education (Technical)
 FCT College of Education
 Imo State College of Education
 Isa Kaita College of Education
 Isaac Jasper Boro College of Education
 Jigawa State College of Education
 Jigawa State College of Education and Legal Studies
 Kano State College of Education and Preliminary Studies
 Kaduna State College of Education
 Kashim Ibrahim College of Education
 Kogi State College of Education, Ankpa
 Kogi State College of Education (Technical), Kabba
 Kwara State College of Education, Ilorin
 Kwara State College of Education (Technical), Lafiagi
 Kwara State College of Education, Oro
 Michael Otedola College of Primary Education
 Mohammed Goni College of Legal and Islamic Studies
 Moje College Of Education
 Niger State College of Education
 Nwafor Orizu College of Education
 Osun State College of Education, Ilesa
 Sa'adatu Rimi College of Education
 Shehu Shagari College of Education
 Umar Ibn Ibrahim El Kanemi College of Science and Technology
 Umar Suleiman College of Education
 Yusuf Bala Usman College of Legal and General Studies
 Zamfara State College Of Education

See also
List of polytechnics in Nigeria

References

Education
Nigeria